Nœux-lès-Auxi (literally Nœux near Auxi) is a commune in the Pas-de-Calais department in the Hauts-de-France region of France.

Geography

Population

Places of interest
 The seventeenth century church of St. Martin,
 A chateau, rebuilt in the 19th century.
 The miller's house, dating from the eighteenth century.

See also
 Communes of the Pas-de-Calais department

References

Noeuxlesauxi